Pepta is a genus of sea snails, marine gastropod mollusks in the family Cancellariidae, the nutmeg snails.

Species
Species within the genus Pepta include:

 Pepta simplex (Laseron, 1955)
 Pepta stricta (Hedley, 1907)

References

Cancellariidae